Willard Ames Holbrook Jr. (May 31, 1898 – July 1, 1986) was a brigadier general in the United States Army. He served as the commander of Combat Command A of the 11th Armored Division during World War II and as Master of the Sword at United States Military Academy between years 1934–1938.

Family
Holbrook was born on May 31, 1898 at Fort Grant, Arizona. His father, Willard Ames Holbrook, was a career Army officer who achieved the rank of major general. His mother, Anna Huntington Stanley, was a painter and the daughter of David S. Stanley, a Union general during the Civil War. Holbrook's mother died when he was eight.

Early military career

Holbrook Jr. graduated from the United States Military Academy on November 1, 1918. He was commissioned second lieutenant in cavalry on the same date and was assigned to the 10th Cavalry Regiment. Before he was sent to the 10th Cavalry stationed at Fort Huachuca, Arizona, Holbrook Jr. was assigned for additional Infantry training course to Infantry School at Fort Benning, Georgia. In February 1919, he finally finished the course and was transferred to the 10th Cavalry.

In July 1919, Holbrook was sent overseas and assigned to Occupation Duties in Germany. He served first with 1st Division at Ehrenbreitstein Fortress and then with the same unit in Coblenz. There he met his future wife, Helen Hoyle Herr, daughter of future Major General John K. Herr, granddaughter of Brigadier General Eli D. Hoyle, and great-granddaughter of Brigadier General René Edward De Russy. They were married in Washington, D.C. on June 7, 1930. They had three children:
 Joanne Stanley Holbrook, wife of George Patton IV.
 Willard Ames Holbrook, III
 Marian Herr Holbrook

Holbrook returned to the United States in November 1922 and was assigned to the 3rd Cavalry Regiment at Fort Myer, Virginia, where he commanded Troop F. In September 1923, Hunk was assigned for Cavalry School at Fort Riley, Kansas, where he graduated in July 1924.

Maybe most significant period of his career was in 1934, when he was appointed Master of the Sword at United States Military Academy. In this capacity, Holbrook Jr. was responsible for the physical education of Cadets. He also established physical standards, which are used today. He served in this capacity until mid-1938.

During World War II, Holbrook served with the 11th Armored Division, and accepted the surrender of Linz, Austria. He commanded the 12th Armored Division from July 1945, until it was inactivated on December 3, 1945.

Awards

Here is Brigadier General Holbrook's ribbon bar:

See also

 Lucius Roy Holbrook

References

External links
Generals of World War II

1898 births
1986 deaths
Military personnel from Arizona
People from Graham County, Arizona
United States Military Academy alumni
United States Army War College alumni
United States Military Academy faculty
United States Army personnel of World War I
Recipients of the Silver Star
Recipients of the Legion of Merit
United States Army generals of World War II
United States Army generals